Amblydoras nauticus, the marbled talking catfish or marbled raphael catfish, is a species of thorny catfish endemic to Peru where it is found in the upper Amazon basin. This species grows to a length of  SL.

It is often found in the aquarium trade where commonly mislabelled as "'Amblydoras hancockii" (a synonym of another species, Platydoras hancockii).

References

Doradidae
Fish of South America
Freshwater fish of Peru
Fish described in 1874
Taxa named by Edward Drinker Cope